R40 Live is the name for both the last live audio album release, and the live video release, of Canadian rock band Rush's R40 Live Tour. Both formats were released November 20, 2015. The performances were filmed on June 17 and 19, 2015, at Air Canada Centre, Toronto, Canada. The performance of "The Camera Eye" featured on Disc 3 was recorded in Kansas City, Missouri on July 9, 2015. “Clockwork Angels” was recorded in Denver, Colorado on July 11, 2015, and "The Wreckers" was recorded in Buffalo, New York on June 10, 2015. Additionally, "Losing It" was recorded in Los Angeles on August 1.

The audio CD album consists of three discs. Disc 1 contains the entire first set, disc 2 contains the second set, and disc 3 contains the encore, and seven bonus tracks.

The video DVD/Blu-ray versions only contains the first three of the seven bonus tracks. It was also the last official live album to feature drummer Neil Peart before his retirement from touring due to health issues in 2018 and his death in 2020.

Track listing
This is the track list for the three audio CDs. Track variations for the video DVD/Blu-ray discs are detailed below.

Jonathan Dinklage performed with the band during their earlier Clockwork Angels Tour, as part of the Clockwork Angels String Ensemble.

DVD/Blu-ray notes

The DVD/Blu-ray discs contain four videos that were used to start/end the show:

 "The World Is...The World Is..." - Played before Set 1; an animated presentation of the band's advance through changing fashion/music styles over their entire career
 "No Country for Old Hens" - Played before Set 2; a montage of jokes and outtakes (mostly chicken-based) from the videos used in the band's four previous tours
 "Mel's Rock Pile" - Played before the encore; features Eugene Levy as his Second City Television character Rockin' Mel Slirrup, a 1970s-era DJ who introduces the band as an up-and-coming act
 "Exit Stage Left" - Post-show video and closing credits, in which the band's dressing room is commandeered for a party by the characters from their album covers

These discs contain only the first three of the seven bonus tracks.

Band personnel

Geddy Lee – vocals, bass guitar, keyboards, rhythm guitar
Alex Lifeson – guitars, backing vocals
Neil Peart – drums, percussion

Charts
Audio

Certifications
DVD

References

2015 live albums
Anthem Records albums
Zoë Records albums
Rush (band) live albums
Rush (band) video albums